The 2007 World Junior Table Tennis Championships were held in Palo Alto, California, U.S. from December 8 to 15, 2007. It was organised by the USA Table Tennis (USATT) under the auspices and authority of the International Table Tennis Federation (ITTF). The competition consisted of seven events: boys' and girls' team, boys' and girls' singles, boys' and girls' doubles, and mixed doubles.

Medal summary

Medal table

See also
2007 World Table Tennis Championships

External links

 2007 World Junior Table Tennis Championship Website
 2007 World Junior Table Tennis Championship page at ITTF

References

World Junior Table Tennis Championship
World Junior Table Tennis Championships
Table tennis competitions in the United States
International sports competitions hosted by the United States
2007 in sports in California
2007
World Junior Table Tennis Championships